Kevin A. Cavenaugh (born May 2, 1967) is a real estate developer and designer from Portland, Oregon, and the owner of Guerrilla Development.

Early life and education
Cavenaugh is from California. He studied architecture at the University of California, Berkeley, and was a Loeb fellow at Harvard University's Graduate School of Design.

Career

Cavenaugh is a real estate developer and designer, and the founder and owner of Guerrilla Development. He became a developer in 2001, and was an intern with Fletcher Farr Ayotte, as of 2004. Cavenaugh is known for his views on affordable housing, displacement, and gentrification. His projects have included:

 Atomic Orchard Experiment
 Box & One Lofts
 Burnside Rocket
 "Dr. Jim's Still Really Nice"
 Fair-Haired Dumbbell
 "Jolene's First Cousin"
 "The Ocean"
 Pub at the End of the Universe
 "Rig-a-Hut"
 Standard Dairy building
 Tree Farm
 Two-Thirds (8735 North Lombard Street)
 Zipper

In 2018, Cavenaugh and his five colleagues at Guerrilla all received the same compensation for one year, regardless of position or length of employment, to "[equalize] the boss to employee ratio" and eliminate any possible gender pay gap.

Two of Cavenaugh's projects, Jolene's First Cousin and Atomic Orchard Experiment, will have units reserved for homeless people and social workers.

Personal life
After working for Peace Corps in Gabon, he relocated to Portland, Oregon during the 1990s.

Cavenaugh and his wife live in Portland with their three children, as of 2016.

References

Living people
American business executives
American designers
American real estate businesspeople
Businesspeople from Portland, Oregon
People from California
UC Berkeley College of Environmental Design alumni
1967 births